Perfection is the second extended play and third overall release by Mandopop boy band Super Junior-M. It was released in Taiwan on 25 February 2011 by Avex Taiwan, to be followed by other Asian countries in March 2011. This is the group's second EP right after Super Girl in 2009 and their first release not to include Han Geng, but instead include two additional members from the main group, Super Junior: Sungmin and Eunhyuk.

The teaser photos of the group for the EP was released on Avex Taiwan's homepage on 12 February 2011. The lead single and title track, "Perfection" (which was written by the songwriters behind TVXQ's "Mirotic", BoA's "Eat You Up" and f(x)'s "Nu ABO")  premiered for airplay on Hit Fm Taiwan on 14 February 2011. The music video teaser was unveiled on 14 February 2011 on SM's YouTube Channel, followed by the music video on 21 February 2011.

The EP was repackaged in April 2011 with a new track and Korean versions of the EP's songs. The Korean version of the title track was included as a bonus track in Super Junior's fifth studio album, "Mr. Simple".

The two main songs Perfection and Destiny have been released in multiple languages. Perfection has been released in Mandarin, Korean, and Japanese while Destiny was released in both Mandarin and Japanese.

The album was one of the best-selling albums of 2011 in Taiwan.

Track listing

Release date
Digital copies were released in Taiwan and South Korea on the 25 February 2011. CD copies will be released in Taiwan on 4 March 2011, and in South Korea on the 3 March 2011.

Japanese version of the album

The Japanese version of the EP contains Japanese versions of "Perfection" and "Destiny". It was released August 24, 2011 under Avex Trax in Japan and sold 16,000 units on its first week of release in the country, debuting and peaking at #5 in the Oricon charts. This version of the album has a different cover. It sold approximately 20,000 copies in Japan, charting for four weeks in the Oricon Weekly Albums Chart.

Music video for Perfection

The Perfection music video was released on separate dates on SM Entertainment's YouTube account, but the Chinese version has been constantly taken down due to minor typing errors in the subtitles of the early videos - the subtitle was displayed in mostly Traditional Chinese characters but a few lines also had some Simplified Chinese characters mixed in with the traditional characters. The latest video was put up on February 28, 2011, with all of the Chinese characters in the subtitles fixed into traditional Chinese characters.

The music video features all members of Super Junior M. However, the video only shows limited appearances of Choi Siwon during most of the video, due to his inability to learn the choreography partly because of a busy acting schedule for Athena: Goddess of War.

Album sales

In Taiwan, "Perfection" has sold over 60,000 copies, making Super Junior M, the bestselling South Korean artist in Taiwan for 2011. The album was heavily promoted in Taiwan during 2011, due to the group's "long stay" of two months in Taiwan to study Mandarin and to accommodate the filming of Skip Beat! for Super Junior M members, Siwon and Donghae. The "long stay" allowed them to frequently appear and promote in Taiwan, which stimulated sales. Additional factors for the album's success in Taiwan included the fact that the pronunciation of "too perfect" in Mandarin was similar to that of "Taiwan is beautiful" and "Taiwanese girl" in Mandarin.

Chart

Album charts
Korea Version

Sales

Korean version

Mandarin version

Release history

References

External links
  Super Junior-M@Avex Taiwan

Super Junior-M albums
Albums produced by Lee Soo-man
2011 EPs
Mandopop EPs
SM Entertainment EPs